Adam Sanat (Turkish: "Adam Art") was a Turkish literary magazine founded in Istanbul by the Adam Publishing house in 1985 and published through mid-2005.  The magazine published the works of many prominent Turkish writers and poets.  Turkish poet Turgay Fişekçi, one of its editors, subsequently founded the literary publication Sözcükler in 2006.

See also
List of literary magazines

References

1985 establishments in Turkey
2005 disestablishments in Turkey
Defunct literary magazines published in Europe
Magazines established in 1985
Magazines disestablished in 2005
Magazines published in Istanbul
Turkish-language magazines